Erica Louise Packer (née Baxter; born 10 November 1977) is a former Australian singer and model. She was the second wife of Australia's eighth richest man, James Packer.

Music career
In 2006, Baxter signed a multiple-album recording contract with SonyBMG Music Australia. Packer began working with ARIA Award-Winning Australian Music Producer Audius Mtawairia who produced most of the album in Sydney, New South Wales. Packer wrote eight tracks for the record. Packer released the Natasha Bedingfield penned first single "I Spy". The track was featured on the Compilation CD So Fresh: The Hits of Summer 2007. The album Through My Eyes was released on 28 April 2007 in Australia and peaked on the Australian Hitseekers Chart at No. 18.

Personal life
Erica Baxter was born in Gunnedah, northwest New South Wales, on 10 November 1977 and attended the private girls' school Abbotsleigh.

She married James Packer on 20 June 2007 after dating on and off for four years. The wedding was at the Antibes town hall, or Hotel de Ville, on the French Riviera. Baxter and Packer have three children: daughter Indigo Alice (born 27 July 2008), son  Jackson Lloyd (born 2 February 2010) and daughter Emmanuelle Sheelah (born 22 September 2012). In September 2013, James and Erica Packer announced their separation.

Discography

Albums

Singles

References

External links
Let's do it again, Mrs Packer Brisbane Times
Packer's second service makes a few waves The Age
Erica Packer plans charity career

1977 births
Living people
Australian female models
People from the North West Slopes
21st-century Australian singers
21st-century Australian women singers
People educated at Abbotsleigh